Binac may refer to:
 Binač, a village in Kosovo
 BINAC, a 1949 computer